Konar is a sub-caste of Yadav or Yadava community from the Indian state of Tamil Nadu.They are traditionally held to be a pastoral community involved in cattle herding and cultivation. who are otherwise also known as Ayar and Idaiyar, and who appear in the ancient Sangam literature as occupants of the Mullai (forest region). However, historically they have held positions such as kings and chieftains.

Etymology 
According to Alf Hiltebeitel, Konar is a regional name for Yadava, the caste to which Krishna belongs. Several vaishnavite texts associate Krishna with the Aayar caste, or konar, most notably the Thiruppavai, composed by goddess Andal herself, most notably referring Krishna as the “Aayar kulathu mani vilakke”. The caste name is interchangeable with the names Konar and Kovalar being derived from Tamil word Kōn, which can mean "king" and "herdsmen". The word might be derived from the from Tamil word kōl, a herdsman's staff. The Tamil word kōl also means a king's sceptre.

The word Ayar might be derived from the Tamil word Aa, meaning cow. The term idai (middle) might refer to the Mullai region, being an intermediate zone between two other Sangam landscapes called  Kurinji (hilly region) and Marutham (cultivation region), but probably reflected their intermediate socio-economic status. Idaiyar remains the most commonly used word in Tamil for a cow-herder, and another name for Ayars was  pothuvar, meaning common.

History 
According to medieval inscriptions the Konars are mentioned as Nandaputras of Yadava lineage.

The Gingee Fort was originally built by Ananta kon of the Konar Dynasty, around 1190 A.D. and was later fortified by Krishna Konar. It was later modified in the 13th century to elevate it to the status of an unbreachable citadel to protect the small town of saenji. It was also the headquarters  domination in northern Tamil Nadu. The fort was built as a strategic place of fending off any invading armies. 

The Gingee Fort complex is on three hillocks: Krishnagiri named after Krishna Kon to the north, Rajagiri or Anandagiri named after Ananda kon to the west and Chandrayandurg to the southeast. The three hills together constitute a fort complex, each having a separate and self-contained citadel.

See also 
Velir
Ay dynasty
Maniyani (caste)
Golla
Gavli
Mayon

References
Notes

Citations

Herding castes
Social groups of Tamil Nadu
Indian castes
Agricultural castes